Florence is a town in Florence County, Wisconsin, United States. The population was 2,319 at the 2000 census. The ZIP code is 54121. The unincorporated communities of Hematite, Pulp, Ridgetop, Spread Eagle, and Tyran are also located in the town.

History
Florence and the area surrounding belonged to the Menominee and was a hunting and trapping region until iron was discovered there in the 1870s. The Florence Mine was discovered in October of 1874 by H. D. Fisher. The mine was named in 1879 after the wife of Nelson Powell Hulst, Florence Terry Hulst. 

The county subsequently took on the same name.

Geography
According to the United States Census Bureau, the county has a total area of 1282 km2 (459 sq mi or ). 153.6 square miles (397.9 km2) of it is land, 4.1 square miles (10.5 km2) of it (2.57%) is water, and 80% is forested.

Highways
 is concurrent with US 141.
 is concurrent with US 2 through the town. North they travel to Crystal Falls south they continue into Iron Mountain.
 westbound connects with Eagle River.

Demographics
As of the census of 2000, there were 2,319 people, 963 households, and 638 families residing in the town. The population density was 15.1 people per square mile (5.8/km2). There were 1,724 housing units at an average density of 11.2 per square mile (4.3/km2). The racial makeup of the town was 98.10% White, 0.17% African American, 0.43% Native American, 0.43% Asian, 0.04% from other races, and 0.82% from two or more races. Hispanic or Latino of any race were 0.26% of the population.

There were 963 households, out of which 27.4% had children under the age of 18 living with them, 57.3% were married couples living together, 6.0% had a female householder with no husband present, and 33.7% were non-families. 29.2% of all households were made up of individuals, and 14.4% had someone living alone who was 65 years of age or older. The average household size was 2.34 and the average family size was 2.88.

In the town, the population was spread out, with 22.6% under the age of 18, 5.3% from 18 to 24, 26.3% from 25 to 44, 26.7% from 45 to 64, and 19.1% who were 65 years of age or older. The median age was 42 years. For every 100 females, there were 100.1 males. For every 100 females age 18 and over, there were 93.7 males.

The median income for a household in the town was $35,640, and the median income for a family was $42,933. Males had a median income of $31,941 versus $19,621 for females. The per capita income for the town was $18,131. About 7.6% of families and 9.7% of the population were below the poverty line, including 12.5% of those under age 18 and 7.1% of those age 65 or over.

Economy
Most residents of Florence county work in nearby Iron Mountain/Kingsford, Michigan. Florence's principal industry is logging. Florence sports the largest ATV and snowmobile trail system in Wisconsin, and is a major county for those wanting to fish, hunt, or camp.

A large paper mill was built in the town in about 1889. Press reports called it the largest such facility in the United States when it was damaged by an earthquake on 7 September 1889.

Education
Florence High School is the area's public high school.

Notable people

 C. E. McIntosh, Wisconsin State Representative, lived in Florence
 Charles White Whittlesey, Medal of Honor recipient in World War I, was born in Florence

External links
Town of Florence Official Website
Florence County School District

References

Towns in Florence County, Wisconsin
Iron Mountain micropolitan area
Towns in Wisconsin
Logging communities in the United States